Beloved Augustin (German:Der liebe Augustin) may refer to:

 Beloved Augustin (1940 film), an Austrian film
 Der liebe Augustin, an operetta by Leo Fall later produced in English as Princess Caprice 
 Der liebe Augustin, a novel by Horst Wolfram Geissler 
 Beloved Augustin (1960 film), a West German film
 "Oh du lieber Augustin", a song composed by the seventeenth century Austrian singer Marx Augustin

See also
 Princess Caprice